George Montagu may refer to:

 George Montagu (died 1681) (1622–1681), English politician
 George Montagu (naturalist) (1753–1815), English naturalist
 George Montagu (Royal Navy officer) (1750–1829)
 George Montagu (died 1780), British politician, MP for Northampton
 George Montagu, 1st Earl of Halifax (c.1684–1739), English politician
 George Montagu-Dunk, 2nd Earl of Halifax (1716–1771), British statesman of the Georgian era
 George Montagu, 1st Duke of Montagu (1712–1790), British peer
 George Montagu, 4th Duke of Manchester (1737–1788), British peer
 George Montagu, 6th Earl of Sandwich (1773–1818), British peer
 George Montagu, 6th Duke of Manchester (1799–1855), British peer
 George Montagu, 8th Duke of Manchester (1853–1892), British peer
 George Montagu, 9th Earl of Sandwich (1874–1962), British peer and Conservative politician